Computer Stew was an Internet video series about technology created by John Hargrave, founder of Zug.com, and Jay Stevens.  Most of the characters in the show are ZDNet employees.  The series premiered on ZDNet in fall 1999, and lasted for five seasons until spring 2001.  The staff of Computer Stew used inexpensive off-the-shelf video tools and hardware to create the show, including a web cam, a computer, and Adobe Premiere software.

Computer Stew Staff
 John Hargrave, host
 Jay Stevens, co-host, usually featured talking through a speakerphone
 Henry Harvey, head writer and creative consultant
 Al Natanagara, producer and artist
 Moses Blumenstiel, producer
 Marty Barrett, writer
 Mike Ward, head programmer
 Tim Elkins, assistant programmer
 Jim Morash, intern

Notes

American non-fiction web series
1999 web series debuts